Charles Spencer "Doc" Wood (February 28, 1900 – November 3, 1974) was a  professional baseball player. He appeared in three games in Major League Baseball for the Philadelphia Athletics in 1923 as a shortstop.

External links

Major League Baseball shortstops
Philadelphia Athletics players
Baseball players from Mississippi
1900 births
1974 deaths
People from Batesville, Mississippi
Ole Miss Rebels baseball players